Hydroacoustic Position Reference is a system to measure the relative position between a transmitter and a receiver under water. It is sometimes used for vessels with dynamic positioning to either measure the relative position between a fixed underwater transmitter or to a mobile under water vehicle (for example ROV).

References

Navigational equipment